

Translators of Homer
Samuel Butler
George Chapman  (Iliad, 1611; Odyssey, 1614–15)
Albert Spaulding Cook
William Cowper (complete, 1791)
Robert Fagles
Robert Fitzgerald
Martin Hammond
Judith Kazantzis
Andrew Lang and Samuel Henry Butcher (complete, in prose, 1879)
Richmond Lattimore
T. E. Lawrence
Stanley Lombardo
George Herbert Palmer
Alexander Pope (Iliad, 1715–1720; Odyssey, 1725-6)
E. V. Rieu
W.H.D. Rouse
Emily Wilson (Odyssey, 2017)

Translators of Herodotus' The Histories
Henry Francis Cary
A. D. Godley
David Grene
G. C. Macaulay
Enoch Powell
George Rawlinson
Aubrey de Sélincourt
Robin Waterfield

Translators of Sophocles
George Adams
Robert Bagg
Theodore Alois Buckley
Kelly Cherry
Richard Claverhouse Jebb
Peter Constantine
John Dryden
Robert Fagles
Ruth Fainlight
Thomas Francklin
George Garrett
David Grene
Richmond Lattimore
Peter Meineck
Robert Potter
Paul Roche
Thomas Sheridan
David R. Slavitt
Isaac William Stuart (1809–1861)
Lewis Theobald (1688–1744)
Paul Woodruff
Theodore Dwight Woolsey
Eduard Wunder

Translators of Thucydides
Walter Blanco
Richard Crawley
Thomas Hobbes
Benjamin Jowett
William Smith
Rex Warner

Translators of Plutarch
Arthur Hugh Clough – revised Dryden's version in the nineteenth century
John Dryden and others – Lives of Noble Grecians and Romans
Philemon Holland – Plutarch's Moralia (1603)
Sir Thomas North – translated Plutarch's Parallel Lives via the French of Jacques Amyot. This was the version Shakespeare used as a source for his Roman plays.
Rex Warner

Translators of Lucretius

NB: His only work was De rerum natura.

Thomas Creech (complete version, 1682)
John Dryden (selected passages)
William Ellery Leonard (complete version, 1916)
Lucy Hutchinson

Translators of Virgil
Frederick Ahl
Cecil Day-Lewis (complete works)
Patrick Dickinson
Gavin Douglas (the Aeneid into Scots)
John Dryden (complete works)
Robert Fagles
Robert Fitzgerald
Henry Howard, Earl of Surrey (two books of the Aeneid into blank verse)
Rolfe Humphries
W. F. Jackson Knight
Stanley Lombardo
Allen Mandelbaum
Clyde Pharr
C. H. Sisson

Translators of the Sangam literature
A. Dakshinamurthy
Kausalya Hart
George L. Hart
Hank Heifetz
P. S. Subrahmanya Sastri – translated the Tolkappiyam
Vaidehi Herbert

Translators of Ovid's Metamorphoses

John Dryden
Arthur Golding
Horace Gregory
Rolfe Humphries
Allen Mandelbaum
Charles Martin
George Sandys
David R. Slavitt

Translators of Lucan
Robert Graves (prose version)
Christopher Marlowe – translated Book One of Lucan's Bellum Civile
Nicholas Rowe – produced a complete translation (1718)

Translators of Juvenal
John Dryden (Satires 1,3,6,10 and 16)
Peter Green (The 16 Satires)
Robert Lowell (Satire 10)

Translators of Martial
Peter Porter

Translators of the Tirukkural

 V. V. S. Aiyar
 K. M. Balasubramaniam
 A. Chakravarti
 S. N. Srirama Desikan – also a translator of the work into Sanskrit
 S. M. Diaz
 V. R. Ramachandra Dikshitar
 William Henry Drew
 Francis Whyte Ellis
 Charles E. Gover
 K. R. Srinivasa Iyengar
 Nathaniel Edward Kindersley
 John Lazarus
 S. M. Michael
 George Uglow Pope
 Herbert Arthur Popley
 Edward Jewitt Robinson
 Satguru Sivaya Subramuniyaswami
 P. S. Sundaram
 G. Vanmikanathan
 Emmons E. White

Translators of other famous Classical authors
Willis Barnstone
Robert Graves – translated Apuleius and Suetonius
Thomas Heath – translator of works of Euclid of Alexandria, Apollonius of Perga, Aristarchus of Samos, and Archimedes of Syracuse
Philemon Holland – translations of Livy (1600), Pliny the Elder (1601), Suetonius (1606), Ammianus Marcellinus (1613) and Xenophon's Cyropaedia (1632)
Stephen MacKenna – translator of Plotinus
Robert Potter – translator of Aeschylus and Euripides
Betty Radice
Ian Scott-Kilvert
Gerald Toomer – translator of the Almagest of Ptolemy
Phillip Vellacott
Rex Warner – translator of Thucydides
E. F. Watling

Translators of The Qur'an

Translators of Medieval and modern literature into English

Translators of Icelandic and other Scandinavian classics
George Borrow
Paul Edwards
Lee M. Hollander
George Johnston
Gwyn Jones – also Welsh
Magnus Magnusson
Aubertine Woodward Moore
Hermann Palsson

Translators of Anglo-Saxon
Kevin Crossley-Holland
Seamus Heaney
Albert Stanburrough Cook

Translators of The Arabian Nights or The Thousand and One Nights
Richard Francis Burton – also translated from other Oriental languages, including Sanskrit
Edward William Lane and Stanley Lane-Poole
Andrew Lang
Edward Powys Mathers
John Payne

Translators of Omar Khayyam
Edward FitzGerald
Robert Graves
John Heath-Stubbs

Translators of Dante's Divine Comedy

Laurence Binyon
John Ciardi
Robert M. Durling
Anthony M. Esolen
Henry Wadsworth Longfellow
Allen Mandelbaum – also a translator of Latin
W. S. Merwin
Mark Musa
Robert Pinsky
Dorothy L. Sayers
C. H. Sisson

Translators of Montaigne's Essays
 Charles Cotton
 John Florio
 Donald M. Frame
 Wyatt Mason
 M. A. Screech

Translators of Rabelais
J. M. Cohen
Donald M. Frame
Samuel Putnam
Burton Raffel
M. A. Screech
Thomas Urquhart and Pierre Antoine Motteux

Translators of Cervantes' Don Quixote
J. M. Cohen – also a translator of French
Alexander J. Duffield
Edith Grossman (2003)
John D. Rutherford (also a translator of Galician)
Charles Jervas
Pierre Antoine Motteux
John Ormsby (later revised by Joseph R. Jones and Kenneth Douglas)
Samuel Putnam
Burton Raffel (1995) – also a translator of Old English, French, Indonesian, Vietnamese
Thomas Shelton
Tobias Smollett
Walter Starkie
Henry Edward Watts

Translators of Goethe
Walter W. Arndt – also a translator of Russian
W. H. Auden and Elizabeth Mayer
Eric A. Blackall and Victor Lange
Louise Bogan
Thomas Carlyle
Michael Hamburger
Michael Hulse
Albert George Latham
Henry Wadsworth Longfellow
Louis MacNeice
Christopher Middleton
Burton Pike
Percy Bysshe Shelley 
Bayard Taylor

Translators of Dostoyevsky
Ignat Avsey – The Village of Stepanchikovo 1983, The Brothers Karamazov 1994, A Gentle Spirit 1996, Humiliated and Insulted 2008, The Idiot 2010
Henry and Olga Carlisle
Ann Dunnigan
Constance Garnett
David Magarshack
David McDuff
Alan Myers
Richard Pevear and Larissa Volokhonsky
Michael Scammell
Frederick Whishaw

Translators of Tolstoy
Peter Constantine
Ann Dunnigan
Rosemary Edmonds
Constance Garnett
David Magarshack
Louise Maude and Aylmer Maude
Richard Pevear and Larissa Volokhonsky

Translators of Prus
Jeremiah Curtin
Christopher Kasparek
David Welsh

Translators of Mann
Peter Constantine
H. T. Lowe-Porter
Herman George Scheffauer
John E. Woods

Translators of Kafka
Anthea Bell
Susan Bernofsky
Mark Harman
Breon Mitchell
Willa Muir and Edwin Muir
Joachim Neugroschel
Malcolm Pasley

Translators of Musil
Eithne Wilkins and Ernst Kaiser
Sophie Wilkins and Burton Pike

Translators of Proust
Scott Moncrieff, Stephen Hudson, Terence Kilmartin and D. J. Enright
Joachim Neugroschel
Christopher Prendergast, with Lydia Davis, Mark Treharne, James Grieve, John Sturrock, Carol Clark, Peter Collier, and Ian Patterson

Translators of Flaubert
Lydia Davis
Francis Steegmuller

Translators of Borges
Norman Thomas di Giovanni
Andrew Hurley
Suzanne Jill Levine
Robert Mezey
Alastair Reid
Eliot Weinberger
Esther Allen

Other French to English translators
Gilbert Adair
Robert Baldick
David Bellos
Mary Ann Caws
Patricia Claxton
Peter Constantine
Charles Cotterell
Robert Fills
Sheila Fischman – translator of Quebec literature
Grace Frick – translator of Marguerite Yourcenar
Stuart Gilbert
Roland Glasser
Arthur Goldhammer
Daniel Hahn
Richard Howard
Tina Kover
Wyatt Mason
Sarah-Jane Murray – medieval French
Curtis Hidden Page
R. B. Russell – translator of Alain-Fournier
Francis Steegmuller
Sarah Elizabeth Utterson – translator of Fantasmagoriana
Louise Varèse
Barbara Wright
Frank Wynne – translator of Michel Houellebecq

Other German to English translators
Thomas Carlyle – translated Jean Paul
Michael Hamburger – translated Hölderlin, Celan
Mary E. Ireland – translated Bertha Clement, Elise von Fernhain, Nikolaus Fries, Elizabeth Halden, John J. Messmer, Karl Gustav Nieritz, Otto Nietschmann, Emma Von Rhoden, Richard Roth, Emma Seifert
Ralph Manheim – translated Günter Grass, Bertolt Brecht and many others
Stephen Mitchell – translated Rilke and others
Natias Neutert  – translated Gottfried Benn, Eichendorff, Ringelnatz and others
Daniele Pantano – translator of Friedrich Dürrenmatt, Georg Trakl, Robert Walser
Herman George Scheffauer- translated Rosa Mayreder, Georg Kaiser and others
Edward Snow – translated Rilke
Jean Starr Untermeyer – translated Broch
Leila Vennewitz – translated Boll, Jurek Becker and others
C. V. Wedgwood – translated Canetti
Shaun Whiteside – translated Freud, Marlen Haushofer, and Bernhard Schlink

Other Italian to English translators
William Arrowsmith
William Aylesbury – translator with Charles Cotterell of Enrico Caterino Davila's Istoria delle guerre civili di Francia
Keith Botsford
Peter Constantine – translator of Niccolò Machiavelli
Richard Dixon
Jonathan Galassi
Louis J. Gallagher
Raymond Rosenthal – translator of Levi
William Weaver
Shaun Whiteside – translator of Wu Ming
Beryl de Zoete – translator of Svevo
Ann Goldstein – translator of Elena Ferrante, Primo Levi

Other Spanish to English translators

Harriet de Onís -- translator of Alejo Carpentier, Ricardo Güiraldes, Fernando Ortiz, Ernesto Sábato, Ricardo Palma and several other Latin American writers.
Margaret Jull Costa – translator of Fernando Pessoa, Javier Marías
Lucia Graves – translator of Zafón and daughter of Robert Graves
Edith Grossman – translator of Miguel de Cervantes, Luis de Góngora, Nobel laureate Gabriel García Márquez, Nobel laureate Mario Vargas Llosa, Mayra Montero, Álvaro Mutis, Antonio Muñoz Molina and many other major Latin American and Spanish writers
Andrew Hurley – translator of Arenas, Borges, Valdés and several other Latin American writers
James Mabbe -- early translator of Cervantes and Mateo Alemán.
Anne McLean – translator of Enrique Vila-Matas and Julio Cortázar
Margaret Sayers Peden – translator of Horacio Quiroga, Pablo Neruda, Carlos Fuentes, Juan Rulfo and several other Latin American writers
Gregory Rabassa – prolific translator of Gabriel García Márquez, Julio Cortázar and several others
Frank Wynne – translator of Tomás Eloy Martínez, Arturo Pérez-Reverte
Esther Allen – translator of Antonio Di Benedetto, Felisberto Hernández, Jorge Luis Borges, Javier Marías and several other Latin American writers.

Other Russian to English translators
Mirra Ginsburg
John Glad
Michael Glenny
Max Hayward
Ronald Hingley
Alan Myers
Vladimir Nabokov

Other Polish to English translators
Stanisław Barańczak and Seamus Heaney – produced a version of the Laments of Jan Kochanowski
John and Bogdana Carpenter – translated Zbigniew Herbert  
Louis Iribarne –  translated Stanisław Lem as well as Witkiewicz
Michael Kandel – translated novels by Stanisław Lem
Czesław Miłosz – translated Zbigniew Herbert
Jennifer Croft – translated Olga Tokarczuk
Jane Zielonko — translated The Captive Mind by Czesław Miłosz

Irish to English translators
Seamus Heaney – Sweeney Astray is a version of the Medieval poem Buile Suibhne
Kenneth Jackson – translated A Celtic Miscellany
Thomas Kinsella – translated the epic Táin Bó Cúailnge
Frank O'Connor – translated Brian Merriman's Midnight Court

Nepali to English translators
Abhi Subedi
Mahesh Paudyal
Suman Pokhrel

Welsh to English translators
Charlotte Guest – produced the first retelling of the Mabinogion
Kenneth Jackson – translated A Celtic Miscellany
Gwyn Jones – translated the Mabinogion

Other Korean to English translators
Don Mee Choi
Bruce and Juchan Fulton

Other Japanese to English translators
Nancy Andrew – translator of Ryū Murakami's novel, Almost Transparent Blue
Donald Keene
Ian Hideo Levy – translator; one of the first Westerners to write a novel in Japanese
Don Philippi – translator of Japanese and Ainu; translated the Kojiki; also a noted technical translator
Alexander O. Smith – professional translator who worked on translations of different media, but is most famous for the English localizations of video games like Final Fantasy X, Ace Attorney, and Vagrant Story
Lucien Stryk and Takahashi Ikemoto
Royall Tyler – translator of The Tale of Genji as well as various Japanese folklore and Noh plays

Other Chinese to English translators
 Jane English
 Howard Goldblatt — translator of contemporary Chinese fiction
 Nicky Harman
 David Hawkes — translator of the Chinese classic Story of the Stone or Dream of the Red Chamber, by Cao Xueqin
 Arthur Waley
 Helen Wang — translator of contemporary Chinese literature, especially fiction for children

Serbian to English translators
 Dejan Stojanović – writer and translator of Circling: 1978–1987, The Sun Watches the Sun, The Sign and Its Children, The Creator, and The Shape

Other Yiddish to English translators
 Curt Leviant – translator of Sholom Aleichem, Chaim Grade, and Isaac Bashevis Singer

Other Persian to English translators
A. J. Arberry
Dick Davis, translator of Attar and Ferdowsi (collaborating with Afkham Darband)
Edward FitzGerald, translator of Rubaiyat of Omar Khayyam and Attar
Sir William Jones
 Rebecca Gould and Kayvan Tahmasebian, translator of Bijan Elahi, Hasan Alizadeh, and various other works
 Wheeler Thackston, translator of Saadi Shirazi, and others
 Sara Khalili, translator of Shahriar Mandanipour, Goli Taraghi, Shahrnush Parsipur, Parinoush Saniee and others
 Niloufar Talebi, translator of Ahmad Shamlou, and several contemporary Iranian poets and writers
 M.R. Ghanoonparvar, translator of Moniro Ravanipour, and classical works
 Elizabeth T. Gray Jr., translator of Hafez, Forugh Farrokhzad, and Simin Behbahani
 Kaveh Bassiri, translator of Roya Zarrin (for which he won a National Endowment for the Arts Literature Translation Fellowship), and various other poets
 Desmond Patrick Costello, translator of Sadegh Hedayat's The Blind Owl
 Naveed Noori (pen name), translator of Sadegh Hedayat's The Blind Owl
 Ahmad Nadalizadeh and Idra Novey, translators of Garous Abdolmalekian  
Sholeh Wolpe, translator of Forugh Farrokhzad, Attar, and various 20th and 21st century poets

Translators of multiple languages into English
Anthea Bell – French, German, Danish, Polish
Edward Dundas Butler - Hungarian, Finnish, Romanian
Peter Constantine – Russian, German, French, Italian, Dutch, Modern Greek, Ancient Greek, Albanian
Will Firth – Russian, Serbian, Croatian, Macedonian
Michael Henry Heim – Russian, Czech, German, Serbo-Croatian, Hungarian
Ralph Manheim – German, French
W. S. Merwin – Ancient Greek, Spanish, Italian, Old English
Joachim Neugroschel – French, Spanish, German, Hebrew, Russian, Yiddish
Ewald Osers – translator of Czech, German
Burton Raffel – Old English, Indonesian, German, Ancient Greek, Spanish, French, Old French, Middle High German, Latin
Abraham Regelson – award winning poet and translator of Hebrew and Yiddish
Douglas Robinson – Finnish, Russian
C. J. Stevens – Dutch, Flemish
John Sturrock – French, Spanish
Wangui wa Goro – Gikuyu, French
Adolf Zytogorski – German, French, Russian

Other translators into English
Geoffrey Chaucer
Musharraf Ali Farooqi – translated the Indo-Islamic classic Hamzanama and Urdu poet Afzal Ahmed Syed into English
Jerzy Ficowski – translator of Polish, especially Bruno Schulz
Alamgir Hashmi
Victor G. Kiernan
Charles Muller
Reynold A. Nicholson
Cecil Parrott – translator of The Good Soldier Svejk
Taufiq Rafat – translated classical Punjabi poetry into English
David H. Rosenthal – translator of Tirant Lo Blanc from Catalan
Nina Salaman – translator of medieval Hebrew poetry
Frederik L. Schodt
Lazarre Seymour Simckes – translator from Hebrew to English
Rabindranath Tagore
Thomas Wyatt – translator of Petrarch

Philosophy

Translators of Ancient Chinese classics
Thomas Cleary
David Hinton
James Legge
Harold D. Roth
Burton Watson
Richard Wilhelm

Translators of Ancient Indian classics
Annie Besant
Musharraf Ali Farooqi
Juan Mascaro: Sanskrit and Pali
Barbara Stoler Miller
Monier Monier-Williams
Max Mueller
Sarvepalli Radhakrishnan
Arthur W. Ryder
Andrew Schelling

Translators of Hellenistic and Roman philosophers
Jonathan Barnes
John M. Cooper
F. M. Cornford
E. R. Dodds
G. M. A. Grube
W. K. C. Guthrie
Benjamin Jowett
C. D. C. Reeve
W. H. D. Rouse

Translators of Augustine
Henry Chadwick
Edward Bouverie Pusey

Translators of Aquinas
Ralph McInerny

Translators of Descartes
John Cottingham, Robert Stoothoff and Dugald Murdoch
Elizabeth Haldane, G. R. T. Ross

Translators of Spinoza
Andrew Boyle
George Eliot

Translators of Leibniz
Peter Remnant and Jonathan Bennett

Translators of Vico
Thomas Goddard Bergin and Max Harold Fisch

Translators of Kant
Mary J. Gregor
Allen Wood and Paul Guyer
Max Mueller
Norman Kemp Smith

Translators of Schopenhauer
 R. B. Haldane

Translators of Kierkegaard
Alastair Hannay
Howard V. Hong and Edna H. Hong
David F. Swenson

Translators of Nietzsche
Thomas Common
R. J. Hollingdale
Walter Kaufmann
Shaun Whiteside

Translators of Heidegger's Being and Time
Joan Stambaugh

Translators of Derrida
Geoffrey Bennington
Peggy Kamuf
Gayatri Chakravorty Spivak

Other translators
Elizabeth Anscombe – Ludwig Wittgenstein
Andrew Bowie – Friedrich Wilhelm Joseph Schelling, Friedrich Schleiermacher
Michael Dummett – Gottlob Frege
J. N. Findlay – Edmund Husserl
Colin Smith – Maurice Merleau-Ponty

Other
List of Arabic-English translators
List of Chinese-English translators
E. A. Wallis Budge – translated The Egyptian Book of the Dead

References
IVANNOVATION - Translation Services and LocalizationList of 100 Professional Tools for Translators 

Lists of people by occupation
Translation-related lists